Dirk H. Ehnts (born 1977) is a German heterodox economist. He is one of the leading proponents of Modern Monetary Theory in Europe.

Early life and studies
Ehnts was born on 11 April 1977 in Bremen, Germany and finished high school there. He studied Economics from 1997 to 2002 at the University of Göttingen and graduated with a diploma. He was research assistant at the University of Oldenburg between 2006 and 2012, from which, in 2008 he was awarded his Economics Ph.D. cum laude.

Career
Ehnts worked as a visiting professor  at the Berlin School of Economics and Law between 2012 and 2014, where he taught classes on macroeconomics, money, and currency. Within that period, he undertook a semester off to work as visiting professor at the Latin America Institute of the Free University of Berlin. In 2015, he moved to the Bard College Berlin, while from the end of 2016 to mid-2017 and again since May 2018, he has been teaching at the Chemnitz University of Technology. In between he taught at Europa-Universität Flensburg as a visiting professor for European economics. Ehnts is a member of the standing field committee History of Economic Thought of the German economists association.

Economic activism
Every summer since 2016 Ehnts has held a course on Modern Monetary Theory at the Summer School of Maastricht University. In February 2019, he organized the 1st European MMT Conference, while in July 2019, together with Pavlina Tcherneva  and Esteban Cruz-Hidalgo, they advocated the introduction of a European finance ministry (the so-called "Euro Treasury") and a Job Guarantee for Europe. The 2nd European MMT conference took place in 2021. Ehnts is also part of the MMT summer school at the University of Poznan in Poland.

Ehnts has published numerous articles in specialist journals and daily newspapers.

In 2019, he was invited by the Bundestag to provide expert testimony on the TARGET2 real-time gross settlement system of the Eurozone. He was the first economist there to point out that TARGET assets and liabilities are not debts. In 2021, he appeared as an expert on the finance committee of the Irish Parliament. He currently writes a column at Makroskop titled TranformNation.

During the time leading up to the 2019 European elections, he was the main architect of Socialist Youth Austria's candidate Julia Herr Green New Deal platform. He co-authored the Green New Deal for Europe.

Personal life
Ehnts lives in Berlin with his wife and their two children.

Selected works

Ehnts, Dirk and Michael Paetz (2021), COVID-19 and its economic consequences for the Euro Area, Eurasian Economic Review, 11, 227–249
Ehnts, Dirk (2022), Modern Monetary Theory: Eine Einführung, Wiesbaden: Springer,

References

External links
Ehnts publications, in German, as listed in the Deutschen Nationalbibliotek
Personal website (in German)

1977 births
Living people
German economists
Economics educators
Modern monetary theory scholars
Post-Keynesian economists
University of Göttingen alumni
Writers from Bremen
German male non-fiction writers